The Isles of Scilly Football League is the official football league for the Isles of Scilly.  The football league is the smallest in the world, with only two clubs.

The league is affiliated with The Football Association.

History
In the 1920s, the Lyonnesse Inter-Island Cup, a competition between the islands of St. Mary's, Tresco, St. Martins, Bryher and St. Agnes, was formed.  By the 1950s, only two clubs remained—the Rangers and the Rovers.  In 1984 the two clubs changed their names to the Garrison Gunners and the Woolpack Wanderers, which are their current names.

The League is attempting to get into the Guinness World Records for the smallest league in the world.

In April 2008, Adidas ran an advertisement called "Dream Big", highlighting the league, featuring several well-known football personnel including David Beckham, Steven Gerrard and Patrick Vieira.

In 2019 the football league tested Fan Assisted Refeering (FAR) in association with Vodafone.

Competition structure

The League competition involves the Woolpack Wanderers and the Garrison Gunners playing each other eighteen times, often on a Sunday.  There also exist two Cups: The Wholesalers Cup and the Foredeck Cup, which is played over two legs.  An "Old Men versus the Youngsters" match is played on Boxing Day.  The season itself starts with the Charity Shield.  All the matches are played on the Garrison football field, on the island of St. Mary's.

The league is played during the winter, from mid-November until the end of March.

Occasionally, a combined Isles of Scilly team play Newlyn Non Athletico, a team at level 14 of the English football league system.  A team from Truro visits annually to play against a combined team.

Honours
The Woolpack Wanderers have won the Charity Shield 5 times—in 2002, 2004, 2005, 2006 and 2007.  In addition, they have won the Lioness Shield twice—in 2006 and 2007.

The Garrison Gunners have won the Lioness Shield once, in 2005.

Concerns
The Isles of Scilly are struggling to hold on to their young people.  There is no sixth form on the Isles so when youngsters turn 16, they go to the mainland.  In addition, house prices are expensive, so they tend not to return until much older.  As a result, the number of players in the league had been dwindling.  In 2008 Howard Cole, a secretary who referees the games, estimated the average age of both teams to be within the mid- to late-30s.

Junior League
In 2020, a Junior League was formed, also with only 2 teams: The Trenoweth Trailblazers and the Flying Falcons. The current holders of the league are the Falcons.

References

Isles of Scilly
Football leagues in Cornwall